is a passenger railway station located in the city of Miyoshi, Tokushima Prefecture, Japan. It is operated by JR Shikoku and has the station number "D25".

Lines

Layout
The station consists of two side platforms serving two tracks. A footbridge connects the two platforms. The station building has a waiting room and a kan'i itaku ticket window.

Platforms

History
At this time the station was operated by  Japanese Government Railways, later becoming Japanese National Railways (JNR). With the privatization of JNR on 1 April 1987, control of the station passed to JR Shikoku.

Passenger statistics
In fiscal 2019, the station was used by an average of 32 passengers daily

Surrounding area
Yoshino River
 Japan National Route 32
Miyoshi City Chamber of Commerce
Miyoshi City Yamashiro General Branch

See also
List of railway stations in Japan

References

External links

 JR Shikoku timetable

Railway stations in Tokushima Prefecture
Railway stations in Japan opened in 1935
Miyoshi, Tokushima